George John William Platt (9 June 1881 – 14 April 1955) was an English first-class cricketer active 1906–27 who played for Surrey. He was born in Richmond-upon-Thames; died in Old Hill, Staffordshire.

References

1881 births
1955 deaths
English cricketers
Surrey cricketers
Staffordshire cricketers
H. D. G. Leveson Gower's XI cricketers